Mathilde Muhindo Mwamini is the  Director of the Olame Centre, Democratic Republic of Congo. She is a former member of the Parliament in the Democratic Republic of Congo. She was awarded the Human Rights Watch's Alison Des Forges Award for Extraordinary Activism. She and her organisation fight   against discrimination and  sexual violence against women.

References

Democratic Republic of the Congo human rights activists
Democratic Republic of the Congo women activists
Democratic Republic of the Congo women in politics
Members of the Parliament of the Democratic Republic of the Congo
Year of birth missing (living people)
Living people
21st-century Democratic Republic of the Congo people